C. petiolaris may refer to:
 Casinaria petiolaris, an ichneumon species in the genus Casinaria and the family Ichneumonidae
 Cordyline petiolaris, a plant species found in New South Wales, Australia

See also
 Petiolaris (disambiguation)